Pantacordis is a moth genus in the family Autostichidae.

Species
 Pantacordis pales Gozmány, 1954
 Pantacordis pallida (Staudinger, 1876)
 Pantacordis klimeschi (Gozmány, 1957)
 Pantacordis pantsa (Gozmány, 1963)
 Pantacordis scotinella (Rebel, 1916)

References

 
Symmocinae